Holly Archer (born 7 November 1993) is a British athlete. She competed in the women's 1500 metres event at the 2021 European Athletics Indoor Championships, where she won the silver medal.

International competitions

Note: Archer was initially disqualified in the final of the 1500 m at the 2021 Athletics European Indoor Championships due to jostling, the disqualification was overturned on appeal'''

References

External links

1993 births
Living people
British female middle-distance runners
Place of birth missing (living people)
21st-century British women